The Division of Yarra was an Australian electoral division in the state of Victoria. It was located in inner eastern suburban Melbourne, and was named after the Yarra River, which originally formed the eastern border of the Division, and eventually ran through it. It originally covered the suburbs of Abbotsford, Collingwood, Richmond and part of Fitzroy. By the time it was abolished in 1969, it no longer covered Abbotsford or Fitzroy, but included Burnley and Hawthorn.

The division was proclaimed in 1900, and was one of the original 65 divisions to be contested at the first federal election. It was abolished at the redistribution of 21 November 1968. For its entire existence, it was a very safe Labor seat.  It was held by only four MPs – Frank Tudor, a leader of the Australian Labor Party; James Scullin, the thirteenth Prime Minister of Australia; Stan Keon, an important figure in the Australian Labor Party split of 1955, and Jim Cairns, who would go on to become Deputy Prime Minister of Australia as the member for the Division of Lalor.

Members

Election results

1901 establishments in Australia
Constituencies established in 1901
1969 disestablishments in Australia
Constituencies disestablished in 1969
Former electoral divisions of Australia